WMSC is a non-commercial, college radio station located at and owned by Montclair State University in Montclair, New Jersey, United States.  WMSC broadcasts at 90.3 MHz, online at www.wmscradio.com and is also available on the iHeartRadio App & Platforms.  WMSC is operated by the students of Montclair State University with university administrator Anabella Poland serving as its current General Manager.

Programming
The station broadcasts and charts alternative/indie rock and pop with a healthy dose of talk, news and sports. Overnight and weekend shifts feature a variety of specialty shows and community programming. WMSC broadcasts 24 hours a day, 7 days a week during the semester and slightly less often during school breaks.

Specialty shows
During evening hours and a few weekend shifts WMSC broadcasts specialty shows:
 The Metal Teddy Bear Experience (Metal)
 Back to the Future 
 Neon Vice Lair (Visual Atmospheric)
 Stomp N' Stroll Radio (Ska, Punk & Rock)
 The Silent Planet (Grunge & Rock)
 Taking it Back with Louis (Throwback top 40)
 Standards and Stories (Sinatra and Friends)
 The Rock Block (Arena Rock)

Community programming
During the academic year, WMSC features a number of talk, local news and local sports shows
 The Morning Buzz (Morning News / Talk Show)
 MSU Newsroom (Public Affairs Show)
 Sons of Liberty (Politics)
 NJ Choice 2020 (Politics)
 Geekly (Movies, Television & Comics)
 Dekes & Dangles (Sports)

Sports programming
The sports department broadcasts all home and select away games for both men's and women's basketball and football. Also aired throughout the year are select games for men's and women's soccer and baseball and select home games of New York Red Bulls II.

History

WMSC was founded in 1966 as WVMS, "The Voice of Montclair State", by a group of Montclair State College students.

The Voice of Montclair State was founded with the vision of becoming another way for student outreach to Montclair State students and the communities surrounding the college.  MSC was primarily a commuter college with on-campus housing for only about 25% of its 1966 student population. Most of the commuters and off-campus housing students left the campus at the end of their classes and seldom returned to participate in the wide variety of campus activities available. A commuter student from Clifton, New Jersey, Ed Helvey, felt that a college-based FM radio station could help better connect the commuter and off-campus students with their campus. Mr. Helvey's interest in broadcast communications began as a young teenager when he became a licensed amateur radio operator. In his freshman year, he founded the Montclair State Amateur Radio Society and then, during his sophomore year, began a campaign to build interest in creating a college broadcast radio station.

By the second semester of his junior year Ed Helvey had recruited a core group of more than 25 students who became the foundation of The Voice of Montclair State. Mr. Tete Tetens, Jr., an Education professor and a broadcast engineer licensed by the Federal Communications Commission (FCC) who worked part-time for WPAT at its Clifton, NJ AM transmitter site, became the faculty adviser. Additionally, Mr. Helvey had the support of Miss Emma Fantone, Coordinator, and Mr. Ted Sheft, Associate Coordinator, of the Audio-Visual Center. They provided the initial studio space for the first WVMS studio in College Hall, the college administration building. Mr. Helvey gained the support of Dr. Thomas Richardson, president of the college, Erik Engel, president, John Van Emden, treasurer and the other officers and student representatives of the Student Government Association, Mr. Gary Leo, Director of Student Activities, the College Life Union Board and the Montclarion. The Voice of Montclair State was also the recipient of the funds raised by the 1966 annual MSC Carnival, providing seed money to get the organization launched. The Student Government Association granted The Voice of Montclair State's petition to be chartered as a Class A organization, which meant that it would receive annual funding from the student activity fees paid by every MSC student as did The Montclarion, the campus newspaper. This was the first new Class A chartered organization in over 20 years. Ed Helvey and his team of motivated fellow students accomplished a lot in a very short period of time.

Ed Helvey spent the summer of 1966 exploring the Educational FM channel allocations, working with a communication law firm and broadcast consulting engineers in Washington, DC, to find an available channel in the crowded New York metropolitan broadcast market.  The fall 1966 semester found the members of The Voice of Montclair State working on programming ideas and schedules, acquiring equipment including several low power AM transmitters to be installed in MSC dormitories to launch an AM carrier-current station by the beginning of 1967. The transmitters were purchased new from Low Power Broadcasting, Inc., while most of the other studio gear was purchased used, including the original Western Electric broadcast console. The station operated from 6AM until midnight seven days a week during the regular semester. Programming consisted of DJ shows spinning donated records, playback of "live" recorded concerts of campus musical organizations including the campus folk singing group, The Dirdy Birdies, interviews with student leaders, promoting campus activities and other programming of interest to the dormitory population and the few off-campus students who could receive the low power AM signal. 

Although Ed Helvey worked diligently at locating an FM frequency for WVMS, it was just not in the cards at that time.  Mr. Helvey was a senior and had to be off campus for six weeks to complete his student teaching requirement. Sadly, at the beginning of January 1967, his father died. He had some significant distractions. Fortunately, Mr. Helvey, who was the chairman of the board of The Voice of Montclair State, had a dedicated and motivated team of fellow students who carried the ball. The leadership of Les Anderson, vice-chairman; Barbara Faber, business manager; Wendy Burke, recording secretary; Ellen Connelly, corresponding secretary; George Steinmetz, chief engineer and the rest of the staff proved that WVMS and the Voice of Montclair State were on firm ground and had the capability of continuing after Ed Helvey and the other seniors on the staff would graduate in a few months.  

Helvey's final contribution to WVMS was to negotiate an arrangement with WFMU, the FM campus radio station of Upsala College in East Orange, to broadcast a 27-hour WVMS Marathon program over WFMU's station one weekend during the spring 1967 semester. Upsala College closed in 1995, however, WFMU is still on the air. Working with the engineers at WFMU, the WVMS engineering staff and the Bell Telephone Company, broadcast tieline division, all the technical arrangements were attended to. Other members of the WVMS staff solicited and gained the enthusiastic assistance and support of many organizations on the Montclair State campus to create 27 hours of continuous live programming that included a talent show, performances by various campus musical groups, interviews, a sports car rally and various other events that allowed the communities in northern New Jersey and the New York metropolitan area to learn what Montclair State College was all about and all of the community oriented activities that were available for their participation and enjoyment. When WVMS signed off and turned WFMU's transmitter back over, WVMS had put Montclair State College on the map a little more than it was before the Marathon, it had pulled together many campus organizations in a display of support and commitment and there was one triumphant, but very tired WVMS staff. 

Launching The Voice of Montclair State and WVMS was an exciting and exhilarating experience for everyone involved and was one of the high points of most of the pioneering team's experiences at Montclair State College. While The Voice of Montclair State began as a dream, it is the product of a lot of dedicated people through the years since that small rag-tag group of pioneers launched it over 54 years ago. In 1974, seven years after the original AM carrier-current station went on the air, Montclair State was able to obtain an FM license, over objections from East Hanover Township that it would harm the operation of co-channel high school station WHPH. On December 9, 1974, with the signing on of WMSC 90.3, Ed Helvey's original dream had finally been realized.

In 1981, WMSC filed to move to 101.5 MHz, having been displaced by changes to adjacent radio station facilities; the move became effective on March 12, 1984. Montclair State prepared for its move into the commercial band by purchasing $32,000 of new equipment and improving its on-air standards. This lasted 10 years until 1994, when, in a controversial decision, the administration of MSC accepted a $50,000 deal from WKXW Trenton (New Jersey 101.5) to move the station back to 90.3. and concerns from Ramapo College over interference to its WRPR. WKXW wanted to reduce interference that WMSC's facility caused to its own broadcasts and had threatened to even petition for the cancellation of the station's license if it did not accept an offer to move. 
The FCC accepted the application over the objections of Fordham University's WFUV; Press covered up to $25,000 of frequency change-related expenses and donated $100,000 in services, including the ability to rebroadcast news and weather reports from WKXW, in the run-up to the change, which took place in March 1995.

In 1994, Montclair State College became a university; however, the WMSU call letters were already in use by a commercial radio station in Starkville, Mississippi. WMSC became part of the brand-new Montclair State University's School of Communication and Media. It also moved to new studios on the third floor of Conrad J. Schmitt Hall.

On March 20, 2015, WMSC broadcasts the NCAA Division III Women's Basketball Final Four from Grand Rapids, Michigan. Montclair State, after winning the NJAC for the third season in a row, advanced to the Final Four against George Fox – losing 70 to 58. The Red Hawks then won the national third-place game over Tufts University 56–48.

On September 14, 2015, broadcast executive Anabella Poland joins the WMSC as General Manager. Before coming to Montclair State University, Ms. Poland was Director of Talent & Industry Relations at SiriusXM Radio where she negotiated and managed interviews, events and performances with A-level Hollywood actors, celebrities and musicians for more than 135 SiriusXM channels.

In January 2016, WMSC struck a distribution deal with iHeartRadio expanding the reach of WMSC as well as increasing visibility and discovery opportunity for the station. iHeartRadio announced in January they had just surpassed 80 million register users.

WMSC celebrated its 50th anniversary with 100 hours of live, uninterrupted event programming from Sunday, April 16 through Thursday, April 20 and a lineup of current and former DJs.

On May 26, 2017, founder Ed Helvey and founding members Ellen Harrigan (then known as Ellen Connolly), Helene & Bob Hinck, Les Anderson and WMSC's first ever faculty adviser, Tete H. Tetens, celebrated the 50th anniversary of the station with current General Manager, Anabella Poland.

Honors and awards

In March 2018, WMSC won the Intercollegiate Broadcasting System Student Award for Best Radio Drama and took home 8 finalist trophies in the following categories:
Best College Radio Station in the Nation +10,000 students – WMSC Staff
Best Community Volunteer Program 
Best Show Promo (The Catalyst) 
Best PSA (Addiction Recovery at MSU) 
Best Play by Play (NJAC Final- Basketball)
Best Station Manager
Best Sports Director

On July 22, 2019, WMSC received their second nomination for the prestigious Marconi Award for College Radio Station of the Year.

In October 2019, WMSC's Digital Marketing Team took home the first place CBI award for Best Social Media in the Nation.

In 2018, the station earned the Spirit of College Radio Day Award after conducting 30 hours of live event programming and providing significant content to the College Radio Day world simulcast.

On July 10, 2017, WMSC received a nomination for the prestigious Marconi Award for best non-commercial station in the nation.

On November 4, 2017, WMSC takes second place award for Best Podcast at the 2017 CBI National Student Production Awards

In January 2016, WMSC is nominated for the Intercollegiate Broadcasting System Student Awards for Best College Station in the Nation.

Notable DJs and alumni
Tom Kaminski, WCBS Chopper 880
Steve Covino, SiriusXM 
Dan Rice, WNBC-TV News 4 New York, Chopper 4
Bob Williams, WKXW-FM (NJ 101.5)
Chris Maget, Shadow/Metro Traffic, WCBS 880
Nancy Reamy, Shadow/Metro Traffic, WNEW AM 1130
Rodney Baltimore, Hot 105, Miami, Florida
Mike Weinstein, Shadow/Metro Traffic, 1010WINS, WKXW-FM (NJ 101.5)
John Henny, Club Or Die Ent
Brian Jude, Film & Video Producer/Director/Writer

See also
 Montclair State University

References

External links

Montclair State University
MSC
Montclair, New Jersey
Radio stations established in 1966